Vernon Harold Timothy Spencer (July 13, 1908 – April 26, 1974) was an American singer, songwriter, and actor. Spencer is best known for founding the popular American Cowboy singing group the Sons of the Pioneers in 1933 along with Bob Nolan and Roy Rogers.

Biography
Vernon Harold Timothy Spencer was born to Edgar and Laura Alice Spencer on July 13, 1908 in Webb City, Missouri. The family moved to New Mexico when Tim was five years old, one of eight boys and two girls. The family later moved to Picher, Oklahoma two years later. In 1931, Tim left Oklahoma for Los Angeles and began working at Safeway.

Career
Spencer appeared with the Sons of the Pioneers in multiple films, and wrote many of the songs they performed. He retired from the Sons of the Pioneers in 1949, but continued managing them until 1952, and recorded with them until 1957 for RCA Victor. After leaving the group, Spencer organized a gospel music publishing company called Manna [Gaviota] Music. The company secured the rights to How Great Thou Art, which provided a solid business footing.

Tim Spencer was inducted into the Western Music Hall of Fame as an individual western music songwriter, and as a member of the Sons of the Pioneers. He was inducted into the Gospel Music Hall of Fame in 1985 and the Hall of Great Western Performers in 1995.

Songs
His most popular commercial song was "Room Full of Roses", which was the No. 1 song in pop music in 1949 and again the No. 1 song in country music in 1974.
 "The Everlasting Hills of Oklahoma"
 "Room Full of Roses" – recorded by Sammy Kaye, Eddy Howard, Dick Haymes, George Morgan and later Mickey Gilley
 "Ride, Ranger, Ride" recorded by Gene Autry
 "A Two Seated Saddle and a One Gaited Horse" recorded by Dale Evans
 "Cowboy Camp Meetin'"
 "Blue Prairie" with Bob Nolan
 "Ridin' the Range with You"
 "Too High, Too Wide, Too Low (You Must Come in at the Door)"

Filmography
 Two-Fisted Rangers (1939)
 Man from Cheyenne (1942)

References

Further reading
 Hear My Song by Ken Griffis
 Song of the West: the Tim Spencer Issue, Fall 1990

External links
 Tim Spencer webpage, including songs
 Sons of the Pioneers Memorabilia
 Tim Spencer at Westernmusic.com
 

1908 births
1974 deaths
People from Webb City, Missouri
American country singer-songwriters
Male Western (genre) film actors
RCA Victor artists
Singer-songwriters from Missouri
Burials at Forest Lawn Memorial Park (Hollywood Hills)
20th-century American male actors
20th-century American singers
Sons of the Pioneers members
Country musicians from Missouri